Nguyễn Duy Quý (6 April 1932 – 4 May 2022) was a Vietnamese academic and politician. He served on the Central Committee of the Communist Party of Vietnam and was a member of the National Assembly from 1992 to 2002. He died in Hanoi on 4 May 2022 at the age of 90.

References

1932 births
2022 deaths
Vietnamese academics
Vietnamese politicians
Members of the National Assembly (Vietnam)
Members of the 7th Central Committee of the Communist Party of Vietnam
Members of the 8th Central Committee of the Communist Party of Vietnam
Guangxi Normal University alumni
Vietnam National University, Hanoi alumni
Foreign Members of the Russian Academy of Sciences
People from Nghệ An province